Krishi Thapanda is an Indian actress and model who works in Kannada cinema. She rose to fame with 2016 film Akira. She made her debut with Akira, which was a super hit, she was also nominated for 2016 SIIMA Awards for best debutant actress for this film.

She was also crowned Miss Karnataka 2014. Thapanda was also a participant of Bigg Boss Season 5, on Colors Super, she was eliminated in the 12th week, but kept entering the Bigg Boss House a couple of times as a wild card entrant.

Personal life 

Krishi Thapanda was born on 23 September in Coorg, Karnataka, India. She did her preuniversity education at Chinmaya Vidyalaya and then went on to complete Diploma in Informations Science at HAL, this is where she learnt to fly microlights.

Career 

Prior to getting into modelling and films, Thapanda worked as an assistant manager at InterCall, an audio conference and meeting services provider based in the US.

2015-2016

While working in InterCall, Thapanda was offered a Kannada film "Kahi", An Anthology based on 4 characters, this released in November 2016.

While Thapanda began shooting for Kahi first, it was Akira that released first. Akira, a Kannada Rom-Com was released in May 2016. Thapanda played the role of Lavanya, a  film director who returned from the US and falls in love with Akira. Akira was directed by Naveen Reddy and Kahi was directed by Arvind Sastry. Kahi was critically acclaimed and went on to win the 2016 Karnataka State Award for Best Screenplay.

2017-present
Following these 2 releases in 2016, Thapanda acted in Eradu Kanasa with Vijay Raghavendra and Karunya Ram in the lead. This released in March 2017 and was directed by Madan.

In  July 2018, released Kannadakkagi Ondannu Otthi, where she plays a character "Pramaya" and it was directed by Kushal Gowda. She plays opposite Shatamarshan Avinash.

Filmography

References

External links 
 

Living people
Female models from Karnataka
21st-century Indian actresses
Actresses in Tamil cinema
Actresses in Kannada cinema
People from Kodagu district
Bigg Boss Kannada contestants
1989 births